Krishna Prasad may mean:
Krishna Prasad (journalist)
Krishna Prasad (politician)
Krishna Prasad (actor)